The United Democratic Party (UDP) is one of the two major political parties in Belize. It is currently the main opposition party, having lost the 2020 Belizean general election, after previously holding the government across three prior terms. Founded as a centre-right conservative party, the UDP is led by Shyne Barrow.

Founding

In 1973 political opposition in Belize was weak and the ruling People's United Party (PUP) had never lost a legislative election since its foundation. The main opposition parties, the National Independence Party and the People's Development Movement met together with a new Liberal Party to consider forming an alliance to fight the PUP. The resulting merger formed the United Democratic Party on 27 September 1973. Controversially, a significant portion of the United Black Association for Development also voted to join the UDP upon foundation.

Subsequent history
The UDP's first electoral test was the 1974 general election in which it fielded candidates nationwide except in Corozal District, where it supported candidates from the Corozal United Front. It won six seats, and was within 18 votes of winning three more. Former People's Development Movement head Dean Lindo was subsequently named party leader. The party had success in municipal elections during the 1970s, but failed to defeat the PUP in the 1979 general elections. Its representation in the House of Representatives dropped to five seats and party leader Lindo lost his seat to Said Musa and was replaced as leader by Theodore Aranda. Despite internal divisions, the party retained control of three towns in the December 1981 municipal elections

In late 1982 Aranda was removed as party leader and replaced by Curl Thompson, who in turn was replaced by former Liberal Party leader Manuel Esquivel following a convention. In December 1983 the UDP won Belize City Council elections and the following year they were victorious in the general elections, winning 21 of the 28 seats. However, they lost power in the 1989 elections, winning 13 seats to the PUP's 15.

For the 1993 elections the party formed an alliance with the National Alliance for Belizean Rights. The alliance won 16 of the 29 seats, with the UDP taking fifteen. However, they were soundly defeated in the 1998 elections as the PUP won 26 of the 29 seats, after which Esquivel was replaced by Barrow as party leader. The PUP remained in power following the 2003 elections, in which the UDP only won seven seats. After ten years in opposition, the UDP won the 2008 general elections, taking 25 of the 31 seats.

In 2020, UDP Prime Minister Dean Barrow called for elections to take place in November 2020. This was during the global COVID-19 Pandemic which had hit the country's economy hard. The pandemic, along with impacts of Hurricane Eta, caused significant voter discontent with the current government. Ultimately, the UDP suffered one of the worst results in the party's history, winning only 5 of the 31 seats.

List of leaders

 Dean Lindo (1974–1979)
 Theodore Aranda (1979–1982)
 Curl Thompson (1982–1983)
 Manuel Esquivel (1983–1998)
 Dean Barrow (1998–2020)
 Patrick Faber (2020–2022)
 Shyne Barrow (2022-present)

Electoral history

House of Representatives elections

References

External links
 Official website
 The Guardian Party newspaper

 
Political parties in Belize
Political parties established in 1973
1973 establishments in Belize
Conservative parties in North America